Alakbar Aliyev (22 December 1955, in Ishikhly, Qubadlı, Azerbaijan – 7 August 1992, in Suarası, Lachin, Azerbaijan) was the National Hero of Azerbaijan, and the warrior of the First Nagorno-Karabakh War.

Early life and education 
Alakbar Aliyev was born on 22 December 1955 in Ishigli village of Gubadly district of Azerbaijan. He graduated from the Sumgait Polytechnic Institute. Aliyev worked as chairman of the Chemical Union of Gubadly district, and then as Deputy Chairman of Sovkhoz in his native village.

First Nagorno-Karabakh War 
Alakbar Aliyev voluntarily went to the front-line when Armenian soldiers attacked the territory of Azerbaijan. On 7 August 1992, he died in during a clash in the village of Suarasy in Lachin District.

Personal life 
Aliyev was married, had 4 children.

Honors and memorial 
By the Decree of the President of Azerbaijan No. 350 dated December 7, 1992 Alakbar Aliyev was posthumously awarded the title of "National Hero of Azerbaijan". He was buried in Martyrs' Lane in Baku. Secondary school No. 204 in Khatai District of Baku is named after him.

See also 
 First Nagorno-Karabakh War
 National Hero of Azerbaijan

References

Sources 
Vugar Asgarov. Azərbaycanın Milli Qəhrəmanları (Yenidən işlənmiş II nəşr). Bakı: "Dərələyəz-M", 2010, səh. 79.

1955 births
1992 deaths
Azerbaijani military personnel
Azerbaijani military personnel of the Nagorno-Karabakh War
Azerbaijani military personnel killed in action
National Heroes of Azerbaijan
People from Qubadli District